Abraham Hendriksz van Beijeren or Abraham van Beyeren (c. 1620, The Hague – March 1690, Overschie (Rotterdam)) was a Dutch Baroque painter of still lifes. Little recognized in his day and initially active as a marine painter, he is now considered one of the most important painters of still lifes, and still lifes of fish and so-called 'pronkstillevens', i.e. sumptuous still lifes of luxurious objects.

Life
Abraham van Beijeren trained with Tyman Arentsz. Cracht in 1636. He lived in Leiden in 1638-1639 where in 1639 he married Emmerentia Stercke. He was back in The Hague in 1640 where he became a master of the local Guild of Saint Luke.

After the death of his first wife he was left to raise three daughters. He married with Anna van den Queborn in 1647. His second wife was a painter and daughter of the painter Crispijn van den Queborn. Anna's aunt was married to Pieter de Putter, a painter of fish still lifes. De Putter may have been the source of van Beijeren's initial interest in the genre of fish still lifes as well as his tutor in this genre.

Van Beijeren's initial works were marine and fish still life paintings. These were not very well paid at the time and the relative poverty of van Beijeren may explain his frequent moves from one place to another. He resided in Delft from 1657 where he joined the local Guild of Saint Luke. In 1663 he returned to The Hague where he remained until 1669 when he moved to Amsterdam. Further moves followed: to Alkmaar in 1669, then Gouda in 1675 and finally Overschie (Rotterdam) in 1677. This was his last home.

The artist may have been doing better financially in his later years as he was able to buy a house in Overschie for 1,000 guilders of which 600 was covered by a mortgage. His wife was reported as being sick in bed in 1679 when she made her will.  The date of her death is unknown. Van Beijeren died in Overschie in 1690.

Work
Van Beijeren signed his canvases with the monogram AVB and invariably failed to include a date. As a result, it has been difficult to compile a precise chronology of his works.

While in the 1640s most of his paintings were seascapes, van Beijeren began to develop as a skilled still life painter of fish. In his early marine paintings he shows the influence of Jan van Goyen.

In the 1650s and 1660s he started to focus on pronkstillevens, i.e. still lifes with fine silverware, Chinese porcelain, glass and selections of fruit. He also painted a number of floral still life paintings, dead bird paintings and vanitas paintings. The move to painting pronkstillevens may have been motivated by economic necessity as they could be sold to a wealthier clientele. These still lifes are often quite elaborate displays and show the influence of Jan Davidsz. de Heem.

He generally used a fairly broad technique and brown tonalities with some precision of detail. Van Beijeren was likely familiar with the other Dutch painters of pronkstillevens such as Pieter Claesz and Willem Claeszoon Heda who were specialists in monochrome banquet still lives. He often worked on a larger scale than his Dutch contemporaries with his tall canvasses reaching a height of one meter.

Collections

The Scottish National Gallery, the Academy of Fine Arts Vienna, the Ashmolean Museum (University of Oxford), the Iris & B. Gerald Cantor Center for Visual Arts (Stanford University, California), the Cleveland Museum of Art, the Dallas Museum of Art, the Detroit Institute of Arts, Museum de Fundatie, the Honolulu Museum of Art, the Los Angeles County Museum of Art, the Louvre, the Metropolitan Museum of Art, the Minneapolis Institute of Arts, the National Maritime Museum (Greenwich, UK), the York Art Gallery, York, UK; the Philadelphia Museum of Art, the Rijksmuseum Amsterdam, the Royal Museums of Fine Arts of Belgium, the Rhode Island School of Design Museum, the Royal Castle in Warsaw and the Seattle Art Museum are some of the public collections that hold paintings by Abraham van Beyeren.  In private collections: Ger Eenens Collection the Netherlands.

References

Further reading
 Bergström, Ingvar, "Dutch Still Life Painting in the Seventeenth Century", New York: T. Yoseloff, 1956.

External links

Vermeer and The Delft School, a full text exhibition catalog from The Metropolitan Museum of Art, which contains material on Abraham van Beijeren

1620 births
1690 deaths
Dutch Golden Age painters
Dutch male painters
Dutch marine artists
Dutch still life painters
Artists from The Hague